= Leo vehicle =

Leo vehicle refers to:

- A satellite in Low Earth Orbit
- A police car (LEO standing for Law Enforcement Officer)
